Interior of St Bavo's Church in Haarlem is a 1636 oil on panel painting by the Dutch artist Pieter Jansz Saenredam, now in the Rijksmuseum Amsterdam. As the title suggests, it shows a view of the interior of St Bavo's Church in the Dutch town of Haarlem.

References 
  Cirlot, Lourdes (ed.): Saenredam, «Interior de la iglesia de San Bavo en Haarlem», en las pp. 80–81 de Rijksmuseum I • Ámsterdam, Col. «Museos del Mundo», Tomo 23, Espasa, 2007. 
  Rynck, Patrick de: Pieter Saenredam, «Interior de la iglesia de San Bavón en Haarlem», en las pp. 292–293 de Cómo leer la pintura, 2005, Grupo Editorial Random House Mondadori, S.L., 
 

Paintings by Pieter Jansz. Saenredam
1636 paintings
Paintings in the collection of the Rijksmuseum